A shuckra is a weapon of Indian heritage and consists of a series of metal tubes on a wire connected to a (metal) handle.
By locking the handle and pulling on an internal wire the device becomes taut and may be used as a stabbing weapon.

Sources 
 FBI guide to concealable weapons
 FOX News:FBI Catalogs Possible Terrorist Weapons

Indian melee weapons